Challenge of the Tiger is a 1980 Hong Kong, American, and Italian Bruceploitation martial arts film.

Synopsis
Two CIA agents - a kung fu master (Bruce Le) and a suave womanizer (Richard Harrison) - track the stolen formula for a super-sterility drug from Spain to Hong Kong, battling terrorists and a Vietnamese spy ring for its possession.

Reception
David Johnson of DVDverdict.com gave the film a positive review and said: "I'll just say this: there's a lot of meaningless fighting, gratuitous nudity, specifically in the opening where one of our heroes plays a few round of slow-motion topless tennis, and one of the looniest fights scenes I've ever seen: Bruce Le vs. a bull.This film's worth comes only from the surreal factor, but it's an excellent companion piece to For Your Height Only."

References

External links

1980 films
1980 multilingual films
1980 martial arts films
Hong Kong martial arts films
Kung fu films
Bruceploitation films
American martial arts films
Italian action films
American multilingual films
Hong Kong multilingual films
1980s American films
1970s Italian films
1980s Italian films
1980s Hong Kong films
1970s Hong Kong films